The Northwest Connector or State Route 462 (SR 462) is a state highway in Cumberland County, Tennessee. When completed it will serve as a west and north bypass of Crossville. The route is currently under construction. One section will use two surface roads on the north side of Crossville.

As of July 2014 the southern portion From US 70 to US 70N is open.

Junction list

References

462
Transportation in Cumberland County, Tennessee